Imperiale Doria (died 1544) was a Roman Catholic prelate who served as Bishop of Sagone (1528–1544).

Biography
On 21 Aug 1528, Imperiale Doria was appointed during the papacy of Pope Clement VII as Bishop of Sagone.
He served as Bishop of Sagone until his death in 1544.

References

External links and additional sources
 (for Chronology of Bishops) 
 (for Chronology of Bishops)  

16th-century French Roman Catholic bishops
Bishops appointed by Pope Clement VII
1544 deaths